Union Bordeaux Bègles is a French rugby union team playing in the Top 14, the first level of the country's professional league system. They earned their Top 14 place by winning the promotion playoffs that followed the 2010–11 season in the second-level Rugby Pro D2. Upon promotion to the Top 14 in 2011, they were assured a place in the European Challenge Cup. 
In 2015, they earned their European Champions Cup place, after winning the European playoffs against Gloucester Rugby in Worcester.

They were founded in 2006 as a result of a merger between two Bordeaux clubs, Stade Bordelais and Club Athlétique Bordeaux-Bègles Gironde. They wear claret (in French: bordeaux) and white. They are based in Bordeaux (Nouvelle-Aquitaine), and play at the Stade Chaban-Delmas. The two teams which amalgamated cumulated nine championship titles of France: seven for the Stade Bordelais and two for the Club Athlétique Bordeaux-Bègles Gironde. Since 2006 and the amalgamation, the club competed in Pro D2 until winning the 2011 promotion playoffs. UBB drew an average home attendance of 23,689 in the 2014/2015 Top 14 season.

History

For several years, the city of Bordeaux suffered from the absence of a leading club, or rather from the competition between the two large clubs of the city, the Stade Bordelais and CA Bordeaux-Bègles-Gironde (named for the suburb of Bègles).

The Stade Bordelais was a large national Rugby team at the end of the 19th and the beginning of the 20th century (seven championships between 1899 and 1911), before continuing their life within the amateur championships.

The CA Béglais did not reach soaring highs before the First World War, finally gaining two French Championships in 1969 and 1991 and then taking part in the first European Rugby Cup in 1995. The transition into the new millennium was hard. The club was relegated to the Pro D2 at the conclusion of the 2002–03 season, then into the Fédérale 1 division, while Stade Bordelais took the opposite direction and reached Pro D2.

In 2005, a plan to merge both clubs was created, in spite of strong opposition by both club's supporters. There was strong insight from former influential players (Serge Simon, Bernard Laporte) who pushed for a result of pooling the assets of the two clubs. One of the arguments frequently employed in favour of fusion was that the local companies did not know which club to promote.

On 10 March 2006, Bordeaux Rugby Metropolis was created. This association gathered a network of local companies eager to imply themselves in the formation of a large club in Bordeaux.

Bordeaux Rugby Metropolis organised in June 2006 the event 'Bordeaux Rugby Quinconces'  which brought together 25,000 people and 100 companies during 3 days on the Esplanade of the Quinconces of Bordeaux. Under the influence of the association, the historical dissensions between the two clubs were partly alleviated. A union was sealed, in the shape of a Professional Sporting Public Limit Company (SASP), with the issue of work for a committee made up of six members resulting with members from each of the two clubs (CABBG : Michel Moga, Alban Moga, Raymond Chatenet; Stade bordelais : Jean-Pierre Lamarque, Herve Hargous, Philippe Moulia).

Only the professional squads were actually merged, as each club has kept its youth teams to this day.

The new team took the place of the Stade Bordelais in the Pro D2. The training centre of Bègles is particularly strong and will hopefully provide players to the top grades.

For their first seasons, the team profited from a budget of €3.6 million. Frederic Martini remained one year as the president of USBCABBG before yielding his place to Laurent Marti, entrepreneur bergeracois (Groupe Top Tex, basé à Toulouse) at the start of the 2006 season. The new president contributed to finalising where the Union's home ground would be (Stage Andre Moga de Bègles), and the unpronounceable name "USBCABBG" which became Union Bordeaux Bègles (UBB) in the spring of 2008. Laurent Marti contributed largely to increase the club's budget, passing it from €3.8 million (euros) in 2007–08 to €4.2 million (euros) 2008–09. The ambition is to rediscover the clubs elite form in a short-term (two or three years).

The Pro D2 2010–11 season, saw the club finish fifth place on the table and gaining a place in the finals. The UBB beat Grenoble (12–19) in the semis, securing their spot in the final against SC Albi. The grand final took place in Agen with the final result going to the Bordealaise (14–21), also seeing them promoted to the Top 14.

Hong Kong investment company GaveKal bought a 10% stakes of the team in 2015.

Name

In spite of calls to simplify the club name, "Union Stade bordelais-C.A.Bordeaux-Bègles Gironde" was adopted; neither of the two clubs wanting to yield.  The Béglais refused to disappear within a name which would only mention Bordeaux (for example, Bordeaux Rugby), whereas, at the time, top-level rugby in the area was the CAB. "We found it hard to find a name for the club which is appropriate for the two teams. The selected name respects the concepts of parity and equilibrium" (Philippe Moulia, président du Stade bordelais omnisports)

In May 2008, the club's name, known for its length, was changed to 'Union Bordeaux Bègles'.

Stadium
The other problem related to the home ground. Neither of the two clubs wanted to yield, so that, for their first season, the team was to play 7 matches at the Stade Sainte-Germaine at Bouscat and the other 7 matches at the Stade André-Moga at Bègles—although the rules of the (French) National Rugby League specify that no Pro D2 rugby club could play their home matches at two different home grounds. During the second season, it was decided that the 1st grade matches would be held in Bègles, while the lower grade matches would be held in Bouscat.

For their ascent to the Top14 competition in the 2011–12 season, it was decided that matches would be shared between Stade Andre Moga (in Bègles) and Stade Chaban-Delmas (in Bordeaux). Since 2012–13, Bordeaux Bègles have played most of their home matches at the larger Stade Chaban-Delmas instead of their traditional home of Stade André Moga. In the 2015–16 season, they also played three home matches at the newer and even larger Matmut Atlantique stadium.

Logo
The logo represents, on one side the blue and white checker work of CA Béglais and the other side the yellow lion with a black base of Stade Bordelais. The crescents symbolises the city of Bordeaux.

Honours / Results

Rugby Top 14
2014–15 – 7th : won European playoffs for European Champions Cup
2013–14 – 8th
2012–13 – 11th
2011–12 – 8th

Rugby Pro D2
2010–11 – 5th; won promotion playoffs
2009–10 – 9th
2008–09 – 11th
2007–08 – 12th
2006–07 – 12th
2005–06 – 7th

Current standings

Current squad

The Bordeaux squad for the 2022–23 season is:

Espoirs squad

The Union Bordeaux Bègles Espoirs squad is:

See also
 Stade Bordelais
 Club Athlétique Bordeaux-Bègles Gironde
 List of rugby union clubs in France
 Rugby union in France

References

External links
  
  Official site of CABBG (Bègles)
  Official site of Stade Bordelais (multi-sports club)

Bordeaux
Rugby clubs established in 2006
Rugby Metropole
Sport in Gironde
2006 establishments in France